Chevella Ravi Kumar (born 5 April 1979) known for his TV pseudonym, Bithiri Sathi, is an Indian TV anchor, reporter and actor. Bithiri Sathi, a title character played by him, is an intellectually disabled person, is part of the daily news, Teenmaar News, on Telugu news channel, V6 News. His news program is a parody on current affairs, politicians and entertainment industry which runs for 8–10 minutes. It is a huge hit for the channel. He became a YouTube sensation with Telugu audience and has millions of hits for his programs.

Early life
Kavali Ravi Kumar (birth name) was born in Pamena village Chevella mandal in Ranga Reddy, Telangana to Yadamma and Kavali Narsimhulu. His father was a drama performer (Bagotham and yakshagana) in the villages. He studied till 5th standard in his village and went to Chevella for high school education. He discontinued education after his intermediate. He was a good mimicry artist and was good at imitating and making fun of people. He became popular among his friends and known circle, and was encouraged to pursue a career in acting in Hyderabad.

Career
Ravi moved to Hyderabad to pursue a career in acting but struggled as was rejected. He worked small jobs to make a living. He finally made his TV debut on Zee Telugu show, Comedy Club, a comedy show with 6–8 participants, and imitation of Tollywood and popular culture personalities. He did well in imitating Tollywood characters.

Narsayya Thata
He started working with Telugu news channel, 6 TV, and did the program, Odavani Muchata and Mana Ooru. He interviewed celebrities and visited remote villages in an old man's attire. It was well received by the audience. He worked for two years until he moved to V6 news channel.

Bithiri Sathi
His character, Bithiri Sathi, is part of a daily news parody show on V6 News, Theen Maar News. His role along with the host, Savithri, is funny and asks hilarious questions in a vernacular Telangana dialect.

He developed Bithiri Sathi character, an intellectually disabled person, by closely watching two persons in Chevella with similar condition. He learnt their true nature, behavior and interaction with the people. Bithiri in Telugu means immature minded person.

Tollywood
He made his Tollywood debut with a side role in 2007 Telugu movie, Seema Sastry. He acted in three movies in 2017. His performance during the audio launch for the film, Nene Raju Nene Mantri, was well received. He did a rap song for 2017 New Year's Eve called as Anti- Virus, and was released on 29 December 2017 on YouTube.

TV Shows
Zee Telugu Comedy Club
6TV Telangana Narssayya Thata  – 2012–2014
V6 News Teen Maar News – 2015–2019(August)
V6 News Weekend Teenmaar Special with Bithiri Sathi – 2015–2019(August)
TV9 Telugu "iSmart News" – 2019(September) – Present.
Sa Re Ga Ma Pa The Next Singing ICON (2020) as a guest in episode 9

Filmography
 Seema Sastry (2007) – cameo
 Rudramadevi (2015) – cameo
 Goutham Nanda (2017) – himself
 Winner (2017) – as himself
 Nene Raju Nene Mantri (2017) – as reporter
 Raja The Great (2017) -as kabaddi player
 Thupaki Ramudu – As lead actor (releasing 25 October 2019)
 Sita (2019)
 Brochevarevarura (2019)
 Gamanam (2020)
 Bhola Shankar (2022)

Awards and honors
 Haasya Prapurna title (2015) – Surya Chandra International's Seva Prapurna Puraskar
 Best Presenter Award (2015) – Padmamohana TV Awards

References

Living people
Indian television presenters
Telugu television anchors
Telugu comedians
21st-century Indian male actors
Indian male film actors
Male actors from Hyderabad, India
1979 births